The Taiwan Democratic Self-Government League (TDSL), also known by its Chinese abbreviation Taimeng, is one of the eight legally recognized minor political parties in the People's Republic of China that are members of the Chinese People's Political Consultative Conference under the Chinese Communist Party. It was founded in the then-British colony of Hong Kong in November 1947, by members of the Taiwanese Communist Party who survived the February 28 incident.

The Taiwan Democratic Self Government League has a membership of 3,000 people, most of whom are prominent people from Taiwan or are of Taiwanese heritage but now reside on the mainland. Additionally, with only 13 seats in the National People's Congress and three seats in the Standing Committee of the National People's Congress, the Taiwan Democratic Self-Government League is the smallest legally recognized minor political party in the People's Republic of China. The party supports Chinese unification.

The party has no political representation in the political arena in Taiwan.

List of leaders 
 Xie Xuehong (1949–1958)
 Cai Xiao (1979–1983)
  (1983–1987)
  (1987–1988)
  (1988–1995)
 Zhang Kehui (1995–2005)
 Lin Wenyi (2005–2017)
 Su Hui (2017–present)

References

External links 
 

 
1947 establishments in China
Chinese nationalist political parties
Organizations associated with the Chinese Communist Party
Political parties established in 1947
Socialist parties in China
Political parties in China
February 28 incident
1947 establishments in Hong Kong
Communist parties in Taiwan